

Sheoak Hill Conservation Park is a protected area in the Australian state of South Australia located on the Eyre Peninsula in the gazetted locality of Miltalie about  north-west of Cowell.

The conservation park consists of two areas of land in the cadastral unit of the Hundred of James which separated by a road connecting the town centres of Cowell in the south-east and Kimba in the north-west.   The land on the south-western  side of the road which consists of sections 49, 50 and 51, was constituted as a conservation park on 30 November 1978.  The land on the north-eastern side of the road which is described in cadastral terms as “allotment 100 of Deposited Plan No. 38006” was dedicated as a conservation reserve known as the Sheoak Hill Conservation Reserve in 11 November 1993. On 6 September 2012, the land within the conservation reserve was added to the conservation park.  As of 2014, access permitted under the state’s Mining Act 1971 only applied to the land formerly in the conservation reserve.

As of 2014, it and three adjacent conservation parks were described by their managing authority as  follows: These parks (sic) are dominated by relatively undisturbed mallee forest, and woodland associations with a Melaleuca shrub understorey.  They provide important habitat for Malleefowl populations and contain significant species including Gilbert’s Whistler, Bentham’s Goodenia and the Six-nerve Spine-bush which are listed as rare under the National Parks and Wildlife Act.

The conservation park is classified as an IUCN Category IA protected area.

See also
Protected areas of South Australia

References

External links
Entry for the Sheoak Hill Conservation Park and Sheoak Hill Conservation Reserve on the Protected Planet website

Conservation parks of South Australia
Protected areas established in 1978
1978 establishments in Australia
Eyre Peninsula